Charles Didier Dreux (May 11, 1832 – July 5, 1861) was the first Confederate field officer killed during the Civil War. He was the son of Guy Dreux and Léontine Arnoult. Prior to the Civil War, Dreux had served as district attorney and a member of the Louisiana state legislature. 30,000 mourners attended his funeral in New Orleans. He is buried in Metairie Cemetery.

Tributes
According to Grace King, those who knew him described him "as a man of great personal magnetism; brilliant, eloquent, dashing." He left for the battlefield as lieutenant colonel of the Louisiana Guard Battalion, in command of Dreux's (1st) Battalion, composed of the first five companies that volunteered from Louisiana. Three months later, he died at Young's Mill (Warwick, Virginia, now Newport News, Virginia) while on a failed mission to capture Union officers who often ate breakfast at Smith's Farm. His last words were "Steady, boys! Steady!”

An Elegy on the Death of Lt. Col. Chas. Dreux, words by James R. Randall and music by G. M. Loening, was published in New Orleans in 1861.

Monument
A monument to Dreux is located in New Orleans at the intersection of Canal Street and South Jefferson Davis Parkway. The text on the monument reads:

Vandalism to the statue includes having its nose was chiseled off in 2017, being covered in a white hood and spray-painted with obscenities in 2018, and being pulled down in 2020.

References

1832 births
1861 deaths
People of Louisiana in the American Civil War
Members of the Louisiana House of Representatives
Confederate States of America military personnel killed in the American Civil War
1861 in the American Civil War
19th-century American lawyers
Confederate States Army officers
19th-century American politicians
Confederate States of America monuments and memorials in Louisiana